Jug Run is a stream in Ralls County in the U.S. state of Missouri. It is a tributary of Spencer Creek.

The stream flows to the east-northeast passing under Route 19 and turns to the southeast as it passes just south of Center. The stream confluence with Spencer Creek is about two miles east-northeast of Madisonville and one-half mile from the Ralls-Pike county line.

Jug Run was so named for the fact customers carried jugs to a whiskey dealer near the creek.

See also
List of rivers of Missouri

References

Rivers of Ralls County, Missouri
Rivers of Missouri